Federigo Tozzi (born 1 January 1883 in Siena; died 21 March 1920 in Rome) was an Italian writer.

Biography
He was the son of an innkeeper. He initially worked as a railway official, but took over running the family inn after his father's death. In 1911 he published his first book of poetry. Two years later, he began work on his first novel, Con gli occhi chiusi ("With closed eyes"), which was highly autobiographical.

That same year, he also founded a nationalist, bi-weekly magazine called La Torre and  became a journalist in Rome. Through his literary activity, he caught the attention of the writer Luigi Pirandello, who subsequently supported him. Tozzi died in 1920 from a combination of influenza and pneumonia.

In the decades following his death, he came to be considered one of the first Italian modernists. According to Italo Calvino, he is one of the great European writers of Italian descent. His style is concise and laconic (Piper Verlag). According to Alberto Moravia, Tozzi describes great tragedies with simple words.

Works 
 Bestie (1917)
 Con gli occhi chiusi (1919)
 Tre croci (1920) (Three Crosses, trans. R. Capellero, 1921)
 Il podere (1921)
 Gli egoisti (1923)
 Ricordi di un impiegato (1927)
 Novelle
 Bestie, cose, persone

External links
 Works by Federigo Tozzi at Biblioteca Italiana (in Italian)

1883 births
1920 deaths
Deaths from Spanish flu
Writers from Siena
Italian male poets
Italian male novelists
20th-century Italian poets
20th-century Italian novelists
20th-century Italian male writers